Üçyol can refer to:

 Üçyol, Bayramiç
 Üçyol, Düzce
 Üçyol, Hasankeyf
 Üçyol–Çamlıkule Line
 Üçyol (İzmir Metro)